The 1980 NCAA Division I Basketball Championship Game was the finals of the 1980 NCAA Division I Basketball Tournament and it determined the national champion for the 1979-80 NCAA Division I men's basketball season. The 1980 National Title Game was played on March 24, 1980, at Market Square Arena in Indianapolis. The 1980 National Title Game was played between the 1980 Midwest Regional Champions, Louisville and the 1980 West Regional Champions, UCLA.

Participating teams

UCLA

West
UCLA (8) 87, Old Dominion (9) 74
UCLA 77, DePaul (1) 71
UCLA 72, Ohio State (4) 68
UCLA 85, Clemson (6) 74
Final Four
UCLA 67, Purdue (6) 62

Louisville

Midwest
Louisville (2) 71, Kansas State (7) 69 (OT)
Louisville 66, Texas A&M (6) 55 (OT)
Louisville 86, LSU (1) 66
Final Four
Louisville 80, Iowa (5) 72

Starting lineups

Game summary

References

NCAA Division I Basketball Championship Game
NCAA Division I Men's Basketball Championship Games
Louisville Cardinals men's basketball
UCLA Bruins men's basketball
College sports tournaments in Indiana
Basketball competitions in Indianapolis
NCAA Division I Basketball Championship Game
NCAA Division I Basketball Championship Game, 1980
NCAA Division I Basketball Championship Game